Matthew Hannan (born March 23, 1988) is an American professional wrestler, better known by his ring name, Matthew Justice. Justice performs primarily on the independent circuit in the Midwest and Eastern United States.

Early life
Hannan grew up in Streetsboro, Ohio. As a child, he enjoyed watching professional wrestling. His father, Tom Hannan, was the coach for the football team at Crestwood High School, but Justice was not interested in sports. He would play in local bands, but was looking for a different calling.

Professional wrestling career
During his junior and senior years of high school, Hannan began professional wrestling when he found out about a training school in Cleveland run by a local veteran of the ring, J.T. Lightning. The school was about 25 miles from where Hannan lived so he started going there a few days a week.

His ring name, Matthew Justice, originated from his first name and "Justice" from Hannan's love for the heavy metal band Metallica's album ...And Justice for All.
The nickname "One Man Militia" came from Hannan's friend and lifting partner.

He would perform in shows throughout Northeast Ohio. He would later graduate from Streetsboro High School in 2007.

He notes wrestler Rob Van Dam as an idol and the main reason that he became a wrestler.

Pro Wrestling Ohio / Prime Wrestling (2007–present)
Hannan debuted in Pro Wrestling Ohio in an interview segment. He soon teamed with Charles "White Socks" Johnson under the team name "Socks of Justice." The two defeated the team of Brian Bender and Ernie Ballz (The Clash). Later, Johnson was assaulted backstage by Bender and Ballz having Justice duel against both competitors unsuccessfully in a 2-on-1 handicap match. Johnson returned a week later as Socks of Justice defeated The Clash in a tag team match. Socks of Justice disbanded for Justice defeated Jimmy DeMarco on his own.

Eventually, Justice formed another tag team with Morty Rackem, calling themselves "Pirate Justice." The team defeated The Clash and V-Squared (Virus and Virus Grande) on multiple occasions. At the first annual Wrestlelution, Pirate Justice unsuccessfully became the first ever PWO Tag Team Champions against Jake Crist and Vincent Nothing and V-Squared. A few weeks later, Justice defeated Benjamin Boone and unsuccessfully faced against Michael Montecarlo.

Going into 2009, Justice was defeated by Bill Collier, Super Hentai, and Benjamin Boone. Pirate Justice later lost to the team of Greg Valentine and Jim Neidhart for the PWO Tag Team Titles. At Wrestlelution 2, Justice defeated Rackem in a Pirate Rules match. Later in 2011, prior to his departure, Justice would be defeated by Bobby Beverly for the PWO Television Title.

Justice returned to PWO on December 13, 2011. The following week, Justice defeated Benjamin Boone. Justice would seek revenge on The Dead Wrestling Society, leading up to him being defeated by Kirst at Wrestlelution 5.

On the February 10, 2013 edition of Prime Wrestling, Hannan returned once again being announced as the third man in a six-man tag team match at the upcoming Internet pay-per-view, Pressure Rising.

At Pressure Rising, Justice turned heel on Prime Wrestling Commissioner, Justin LaBar, Matt Cross, and Gregory Iron as he pretended to suffer a knee injury during the match, making it a 3-on-1 handicap match, only to later come out and assault Cross with LaBar's stolen laptop to allow Vic Travagliante to become the new permanent Commissioner.

On the April 21, 2013 edition of Prime Wrestling, Justice defeated Facade for the Prime Television Championship due to an interference by Justice's girlfriend, Marti Belle. The two had a celebratory kiss afterward. At Wrestlelution 6 on October 20, Justice lost the Prime Television Title to Matt Cross.

World Wrestling Entertainment / WWE (2010–2011)
On the May 10, 2010 edition of Raw at the Mellon Arena in Pittsburgh, Pennsylvania, Hannan lost in a dark match against Dos Caras, Jr. Hannan made his WWE television debut as a jobber on the June 13, 2010 episode of WWE Superstars where he faced the team of Vance Archer and Curt Hawkins under the ring name Matthew Busch. Hannan once again appeared on the January 28, 2011 edition of WWE Smackdown, again facing off against Alberto Del Rio in an exhibition Royal Rumble match under the ring name Mike Stevens.

On March 18, 2011, Hannan signed a WWE developmental contract, and was assigned to their developmental territory Florida Championship Wrestling (FCW) located in Tampa, Florida under the ring name Mack Hetfield. After spending six months in Florida, he was released in September 2011.

Other media

Hannan has also appeared as an extra in three feature films: Abduction, starring Taylor Lautner and Sigourney Weaver; Warrior, starring Tom Hardy and Nick Nolte; and Jack Reacher starring Tom Cruise.

Hannan is also featured in the Cleveland, Ohio based alternative metal band Mushroomhead's music video for their single "Come On" from the album Beautiful Stories for Ugly Children. The video aired on MTV2's Headbangers Ball.

Before moving back home, Hannan lived in New York City for a year.

In January 2013, Hannan and his family opened up a gym, Boro Barbell, in his hometown of Streetsboro, Ohio. Before opening the gym, he had called his dad to tell him about the idea. He received help from his dad with financing and help from his twin brothers, Jon and Pete, with the construction and painting.

Championships and accomplishments

Absolute Intense Wrestling
AIW Absolute Championship (1 time) 
AIW Intense Championship (2 time)
AIW Tag Team Championship (1 time) – with John Thorne
JT Lightning Invitational Tournament (2019)
AAW Wrestling
AAW Tag Team Championship (1 time) – with 1 Called Manders
Blackcraft Wrestling
Blackcraft Heavyweight Championship (1 time)
Championship Wrestling Experience
CWE Tag Team Championship (1 time) – with Gregory Iron
Firestorm Pro Wrestling
Firestorm Pro Tag Team Championship (1 time) – with Nickie Valentino
Game Changer Wrestling
GCW Tag Team Championship (1 time) - with Mance Warner
Horror Slam Wrestling
Horror Slam Tag Team Championship (1 time, current) - with Mance Warner
International Wrestling Cartel
IWC Super Indy Championship (2 time)
NWA East / Pro Wrestling eXpress
NWA East/PWX Tag Team Championship (1 time) – with Gregory Iron
New York Wrestling Connection
NYWC Tag Team Championship (2 times) – with Jesse Vane
Paradigm Pro Wrestling
PPW Tag Team Championships (1 time) - with Bobby Beverly
 Pro Wrestling Illustrated
Ranked No. 352 of the top 500 singles wrestlers in the PWI 500 in 2021
Pro Wrestling Ohio / Prime Wrestling
Prime Television Championship (1 time)
PWO Tag Team Championships (1 time) - with Mitty Rackem
Pro Wrestling eXpress
PWX Television Championship (1 time)
PWX Three Rivers Championship (1 time)
Vicious Outcast Wrestling 
Natural Cup Tournament (2014)

References

External links
Matt Hannan's Facebook profile
Matthew Justice

American male professional wrestlers
Living people
People from Geauga County, Ohio
1988 births
People from Portage County, Ohio
Professional wrestlers from Ohio
21st-century professional wrestlers
AAW Tag Team Champions